BPN can stand for:

In business, governments and organizations
 Banco Português de Negócios, a Portuguese bank
 Business Partner Network, a source for vendor data for the US federal government

Places
 Babiogórski Park Narodowy
 Białowieski Park Narodowy
 Biebrzański Park Narodowy
 Bieszczadzki Park Narodowy

Computing
 Business process network, a secure, distributed network service similar to a virtual private network
 An authority control identifier issued by the Dutch Biografisch Portaal

Science
 Boron-potassium nitrate, a pyrotechnic initiator

Transportation
 National Rail station code for Blackpool North railway station
 Sultan Aji Muhammad Sulaiman Sepinggan Airport, Balikpapan, Indonesia (IATA code)